Urwah ibn Masud is a Thaqifi chieftain of Taif who became a companion of Muhammad. He was one of the first people from his tribe to accept Islam, and he was killed by his fellow chieftains while preaching Islam in his home city. He was a brother of Barza bint Mas'ud, who married Safwan ibn Umayya.

He was one of the notables of Arabia who entered the negotiations regarding the peace of Hudaybiyah on behalf of Quraysh. He said, "I have visited the kings of Persia, Rome and Abyssinia, but I have not seen any leader more revered and respected by his people than Muhammad. If he ordered them to do anything, they do it without delay. If he performs Ablution they all seek the remainder of the water he used. They never look at him in the eyes, out of respect."

Personal life 
By his wife Amina bint Abi Sufyan, he had a son named Dawud, who married his maternal cousin, Habibah bint Ubayd Allah.

Appearance 
In a hadith reported in Sahih Muslim, Muhammad mentioned that ʿĪsā (Jesus) resembled ibn Mas'ud closest in appearance. By descriptions of 'Isa attributed to Muhammed, this would indicate reddish complexion, moderate height and curly, flowing hair.

Death
After Urwa became Muslim, he returned to Ta'if and preached about Islam to his people. But his people didn't like that he was Muslim and struck him with arrows.

See also 
 Adnanite Arabs
 List of notable Hijazis
 Treaty of Hudaybiyah

References

External links 
 story from witness-pioneer.org.

Banu Thaqif
Companions of the Prophet
6th-century Arabs